Porter Crossroads is an unincorporated community in Porter Township, Porter County, in the U.S. state of Indiana.

History
A post office was established at Porter Crossroads in 1844, and remained in operation until 1873. Porter was the name of an early postmaster.

Geography

References

Unincorporated communities in Porter County, Indiana
Unincorporated communities in Indiana